Dennis Gratz (born Muhamed Gracić, 15 September 1978) is a Bosnian politician who was the president of the socio-liberal Our Party, and is member of the Federal House of Representatives.

Personal life
Gratz lives in Sarajevo, Bosnia and Herzegovina.

References

External links
Dennis Gratz at javnarasprava.ba

1978 births
Living people
Politicians from Sarajevo
University of Sarajevo alumni
Our Party (Bosnia and Herzegovina) politicians
Democratic Front (Bosnia and Herzegovina) politicians